Yushatyrka (Yuşatır) is a rural locality (a village) in Muraptalovsky Selsoviet, Kuyurgazinsky District, Bashkortostan, Russia. The population was 222 as of 2010. There are 4 streets.

Geography 
Yushatyrka is located 30 km south of Yermolayevo (the district's administrative centre) by road. Aksarovo is the nearest rural locality.

References 

Rural localities in Kuyurgazinsky District